Distimake is a genus of flowering plants belonging to the family Convolvulaceae.

Its native range is Tropics and Subtropics.

Species:

Distimake aegyptius 
Distimake ampelophyllus 
Distimake aturensis 
Distimake aureus 
Distimake austinii 
Distimake bipinnatipartitus 
Distimake cielensis 
Distimake cissoides 
Distimake contorquens 
Distimake davenportii 
Distimake digitatus 
Distimake dimorphophyllus 
Distimake dissectus 
Distimake ericoides 
Distimake flagellaris 
Distimake grandiflorus 
Distimake guerichii 
Distimake hasslerianus 
Distimake hirsutus 
Distimake hoehnei 
Distimake igneus 
Distimake kentrocaulos 
Distimake kimberleyensis 
Distimake lobulibracteatus 
Distimake macdonaldii 
Distimake macrocalyx 
Distimake maragniensis 
Distimake multisectus 
Distimake nervosus 
Distimake palmeri 
Distimake quercifolius 
Distimake quinatus 
Distimake quinquefolius 
Distimake repens 
Distimake rhyncorhiza 
Distimake sagastegui-alvae 
Distimake semisagittus 
Distimake somalensis 
Distimake stellatus 
Distimake subpalmatus 
Distimake ternifoliolus 
Distimake tomentosus 
Distimake tuberosus 
Distimake weberbaueri

References

Convolvulaceae
Convolvulaceae genera
Taxa named by Constantine Samuel Rafinesque